Irina Ramialison (born 9 June 1991) is a French former professional tennis player.

On 10 November 2014, she reached a career-high singles ranking of world No. 243. On 13 July 2015, she peaked at No. 196 in the WTA doubles rankings.

Career

2014
Ramialison received a wildcard for the women's doubles tournament at the 2014 French Open alongside Constance Sibille; they lost in the first round to Madison Keys and Alison Riske. Ramialison also received a wildcard for the singles qualifying of that tournament, only dropping a single game to beat Kristína Kučová in the first round, before falling in the second to Michelle Larcher de Brito in straight sets.

ITF Circuit finals

Singles: 18 (13 titles, 5 runner–ups)

Doubles: 10 (4 titles, 6 runner–ups)

External links

 
 

1991 births
Living people
French female tennis players
French sportspeople of Malagasy descent
Sportspeople from Rennes
21st-century French women